Aurangabad ( officially known as Chhatrapati Sambhaji Nagar, also spelt Chhatrapati Sambhajinagar, is a city in the Indian state of Maharashtra. It is the administrative headquarters of Aurangabad district and is the largest city in the Marathwada region. Located on a hilly upland terrain in the Deccan Traps, Aurangabad is the fifth-most populous urban area in Maharashtra with a population of 1,175,116. The city is known as a major production center of cotton textile and artistic silk fabrics. Several prominent educational institutions, including Dr. Babasaheb Ambedkar Marathwada University, are located in the city. The city is also a popular tourism hub, with tourist destinations like the Ajanta and Ellora caves lying on its outskirts, both of which have been designated as UNESCO World Heritage Sites since 1983. Other tourist attractions include the Aurangabad Caves, Devagiri Fort, Grishneshwar Temple, Jama Mosque, Bibi Ka Maqbara, Himayat Bagh, Panchakki and Salim Ali Lake. Historically, there were 52 Gates in Aurangabad, some of them extant, because of which Aurangabad is nicknamed as the "City of Gates". In 2019, the Aurangabad Industrial City (AURIC) became the first greenfield industrial smart city of India under the country's flagship Smart Cities Mission.

Paithan, the imperial capital of the Satavahana dynasty (1st century BCE–2nd century CE), as well as Dēvagirī, the capital of the Yadava dynasty (9th century CE–14th century CE), are located within the limits of modern Aurangabad. In 1308, the region was annexed by the Delhi Sultanate during the rule of Sultan Alauddin Khalji. In 1327, the capital of the Delhi Sultanate was shifted from Delhi to Daulatabad (in present-day Aurangabad) during the rule of Sultan Muhammad bin Tughluq, who ordered a mass migration of Delhi's population to Daulatabad. However, Muhammad bin Tughluq reversed his decision in 1334 and the capital was shifted back to Delhi. In 1499, Daulatabad became a part of the Ahmadnagar Sultanate. In 1610, a new city named Khaḍkī was established at the location of modern Aurangabad to serve as the capital of the Ahmadnagar Sultanate by the Ethiopian military leader Malik Ambar, who was brought to India as a slave but rose to become a popular Prime Minister of the Ahmadnagar Sultanate. Malik Ambar was succeeded by his son Fateh Khan, who changed the name of the city to Fatehnagar. In 1636, Aurangzeb, who was then the Mughal viceroy of the Deccan region, annexed the city into the Mughal Empire. In 1653, Aurangzeb renamed the city as "Aurangabad" and made it the capital of the Deccan region of the Mughal Empire. In 1724, the Mughal governor of the Deccan, Nizam Asaf Jah I, seceded from the Mughal Empire and founded his own Asaf Jahi dynasty. The dynasty established the State of Hyderabad with their capital initially at Aurangabad, until they transferred their capital to the city of Hyderabad in 1763. Hyderabad State became a princely state during the British Raj, and remained so for 150 years (1798–1948). Until 1956, Aurangabad remained part of Hyderabad State. In 1960, Aurangabad and the larger Marathi-speaking Marathwada region became a part of the state of Maharashtra.

History

Khaḍkī was the original name of the village which was made a capital city by Malik Ambar, the Prime Minister of Murtaza Nizam Shah II, Sultan of Ahmednagar. Within a decade, Khaḍkī grew into a populous and imposing city. Malik Ambar died in 1626. He was succeeded by his son Fateh Khan, who changed the name of Khaḍkī to Fatehnagar. With the capture of Devagiri Fort by the imperial troops in 1633, the Nizam Shahi dominions, including Fatehnagar, came under the possession of the Mughals.

In 1653, when Mughal prince Aurangzeb was appointed the Viceroy of the Deccan for the second time, he made Fatehnagar his capital and renamed it Aurangabad. Aurangabad is sometimes referred to as Khujista Bunyad by the chroniclers of Aurangzeb's reign.

In 1667 Muazzam, son of Aurangzeb became governor of this province. Before him Mirza Rajah Jai Singh was in-charge of this province for some time.

In 1681, after Aurangzeb's coronation as emperor, he shifted his court from the capital city of Delhi to Aurangabad in order to conduct his military campaigns in the Deccan. The presence of Mughal elites in the city led to urban development, as numerous public and private buildings were constructed. Though Aurangzeb chose not to reside in the city after 1684, the city retained importance as the primary military outpost of the Mughal Deccan, attracting wealth and turning Aurangabad into a centre of trade; the manufacture of embroidered silks emerged during this period and is still practiced in Aurangabad today. Mughal Aurangabad was also a cultural hub, serving as an important centre of Persian and Urdu literature. During the Mughal era, Aurangabad had an estimated population of 200,000 people, living in 54 suburbs.

In 1724, Asaf Jah, a Mughal general and Nizam al-Mulk in the Deccan region, decided to secede from the crumbling Mughal Empire, with the intention of founding his own dynasty in the Deccan. Aurangabad continued to be politically and culturally significant for the next 40 years as capital of Asaf Jah's new dominion, until his son and successor Nizam Ali Khan Asaf Jah II transferred the capital to Hyderabad in 1763. The loss of Aurangabad's privileged position led to a period of economic decline; by the beginning of the 19th century, the city had become notably underpopulated, leading to the crippling of its administration, and its buildings were in decay. However, Aurangabad would continue to be important as the "second city" of the Nizam's dominions for the remainder of the polity's lifetime.

In 1816, the British established a cantonment outside Aurangabad (as they did in other parts of the Nizam's dominions), but were discouraged from entering the city proper by the Nizam's officials. As a princely state under British suzerainty, the Nizam's Hyderabad State was quasi-autonomous, meaning that Aurangabad's culture was somewhat free of colonial influence.

Aurangabad began to industrialise in the late 19th century, with the city's first cotton mill being opened in 1889. The population of the city was 30,000 in 1881, growing to 36,000 over the next two decades. Aurangabad was particularly affected by Deccan famines in 1899-1900, 1918, and 1920, causing surges in crime.

Following Indian independence, Hyderabad State was annexed into the Indian Union in 1948, and consequently Aurangabad became a part of the Indian Union's Hyderabad State. In 1956, it passed into the newly formed bilingual Bombay State, and in 1960 it became a part of Maharashtra state.

Bal Thackeray in 1988 proposed the city to be renamed as Sambhajinagar. The local governing body i.e., City Corporation passed a resolution on name change in 1995. On 29 June 2022, the Shiv Sena-led Maharashtra cabinet approved the renaming of Aurangabad to Sambhaji Nagar, after Sambhaji Bhosale, second Chhatrapati of the Maratha Empire.

Geography
The co-ordinates for Aurangabad are N 19° 53' 47" – E 75° 23' 54". The city is surrounded by hills on all directions.

Climate
Aurangabad features a semiarid climate under the Köppen climate classification. Annual mean temperatures range from 17 to 33 °C, with the most comfortable time to visit in the winter – October to February. The highest maximum temperature ever recorded was 46 °C (114 °F) on 25 May 1905. The lowest recorded temperature was 2 °C (36 °F) on 2 February 1911. In the cold season, the district is sometimes affected by cold waves in association with the eastward passage of western disturbances across north India, when the minimum temperature may drop down to about 2 °C to 4 °C (35.6 °F to 39.2 °F).

Most of the rainfall occurs in the monsoon season from June to September. Thunderstorms occur between November to April. Average annual rainfall is 710 mm. The city is often cloudy during the monsoon season and the cloud cover may remain together for days. The daily maximum temperature in the city often drops to around 22 °C due to the cloud cover and heavy rains.

Geology

The entire area is covered by the Deccan Traps lava flows of Upper Cretaceous to Lower Eocene age. The lava flows are overlain by thin alluvial deposits along the Kham and Sukhana river. The basaltic lava flows belonging to the Deccan Trap is the only major geological formation occurring in Aurangabad. The lava flows are horizontal and each flow has two distinct units. The upper layers consist of vesiculara and amygdaloidal zeolitic basalt while the bottom layer consists of massive basalt. The lava flows are individually different in their ability to receive as well as hold water in storage and to transmit it. The difference in the productivity of groundwater in various flows arises as a result of their inherent physical properties such as porosity and permeability. The groundwater occurs under water table conditions and is mainly controlled by the extent of its secondary porosity i.e. thickness of weathered rocks and spacing of joints and fractures. The highly weathered vesicular trap and underlying weathered jointed and fractured massive trap constitutes the main water-yielding zones. The soil is mostly formed from igneous rocks and is black, medium black, shallow and calcareous types having different depths and profiles.

Demographics

According to the 2011 Indian Census, Aurangabad has a population of 1,175,116, of which 609,206 are males and 565,910 are females. Population in the age range of 0 to 6 years is 158,779. The total number of literates in Aurangabad was 889,224, which constituted 75.67% of the population with male literacy of 79.34% and female literacy of 71.72%. The effective literacy rate of 7+ population of Aurangabad was 87.5%, of which male literacy rate was 92.2% and female literacy rate was 82.5%. The Scheduled Castes and Scheduled Tribes population is 229,223 and 15,240 respectively. There were 236659 households in Aurangabad in 2011.

Religion 

The majority of the population in Aurangabad are Hindu (51%), followed by 30% Muslim, 15.2% Buddhist and 1.6% Jain. There are a substantial number of adherents of Sikhism and Christianity in the city. Buddhists are of Navayana tradition who are mostly scheduled castes.

Language

Marathi is the official language of the city. Marathi is also the most commonly spoken language in the city, followed by Urdu and Hindi.

Administration and politics

Local administration

Aurangabad Municipal Corporation (AMC) is the local civic body. It is divided into six zones. The Municipal Council was established in 1936, the Municipal Council area was about 54.5 km2. It was elevated to the status of Municipal Corporation from 8 December 1982, and simultaneously including eighteen peripheral villages, making the total area under its jurisdiction to 138.5 km2 extended its limits.

The city is divided in 115 electoral wards called as Prabhag, and each ward is represented by a Corporator elected by the people from each ward. There are two Committees, General Body and Standing Committee headed by the Mayor and the chairman respectively. AMC is responsible for providing basic amenities like drinking water, drainage facility, road, street lights, healthcare facilities, primary schools, etc. AMC collects its revenue from the urban taxes which are imposed on citizens. The administration is headed by the Municipal Commissioner; an IAS Officer, assisted by the other officers of different departments.Aurangabad Metropolitan Region Development Authority (AMRDA) is being Formed for the Allover Development of the Region.

State and central administration
Aurangabad division is one of the six administrative divisions of Maharashtra state in India. Aurangabad divisions almost completely coincides with the Marathwada region of Maharashtra. Aurangabad contributes one seat to the Lok Sabha – Aurangabad (Lok Sabha constituency). In 2019 general election, AIMIM candidate Sayed Imtiyaz Jaleel was elected as a member of parliament from Aurangabad.

Aurangabad also contributes three state assembly seats namely Aurangabad East, Aurangabad Central and Aurangabad West which are represented by Atul Moreshwar Save (BJP), Pradeep Jaiswal (Shiv-Sena) and Sanjay Shirsat (Shiv-Sena) respectively since 2019 Maharashtra Legislation Assembly election.

Economy
 

Aurangabad is considered to be a classic example of efforts of state government towards balanced industrialisation of state. The city was a major silk and cotton textile production center. A fine blend of silk with locally grown cotton was developed as Himroo textile. Paithani silk saris are also made in Aurangabad. With the opening of the Hyderabad-Godavari Valley Railways in the year 1900 several ginning factories were started. After 1960, Maharashtra Industrial Development Corporation (MIDC) began acquiring land and setting up industrial estates. The Maharashtra Center For Entrepreneurship Development's main office is in Aurangabad. Major industries in Auragabad are manufacturing, biotechnology, pharmaceuticals and automobiles etc. In the 1990s, land near Shendra village on the Aurangabad-Jalna route was purchased. The MIDC created the Waluj and Chikalthana Industrial Areas as part of its efforts, which were quickly purchased.

Aurangabad is surrounded by the industrial areas (MIDCs) of Chikhalthana, Shendra and Waluj MIDC. A new industrial belt namely Shendra - Bidkin Industrial Park is being developed under DMIC. Major Siemens and automotive companies such as BMW, Audi India, Skoda Auto, Bajaj Auto and Goodyear Tire and Rubber Company have there units in the city. One of the largest Russian Steel Company NLMK has setup plant in DMIC Shendra phase.

Culture/Cityscape

Culture

The culture of Aurangabad city is heavily influenced by the culture of Hyderabad. The old city still retains the cultural flavour and charms of Muslim culture of Hyderabad. Its influence is reflected in the language and cuisine of the locals. Although Urdu is among the principal languages of the city, along with Marathi and Hindi, it is spoken in the Dakhni – Hyderabadi Urdu dialect.
 Wali Dakhni also known as Wali Aurangabadi (1667–1731 or 1743) was a classical poet of Urdu from Aurangabad. He was the first established poet to have composed in Urdu language. Prominent poets like Shah Hatem, Shah Abro, Mir Taqi Mir, Zauq and Sauda were among his admirers. Other prominent poets from Aurangabad include Siraj Aurangabadi, Azad Bilgrami and Sikandar Ali Wajd.
 Abul Ala Maududi one of the Muslim scholars (1903–1979) was born in Aurangabad, India. Syed Abul A'ala Maududi was born to Maulana Ahmad Hasan, a lawyer by profession. His father was "descended from the Chishti line of saints. He was also the founder of Jamaat-e-Islami, the Islamic revivalist party.

Tourist attractions

Aurangabad is a historical city along with its surrounding towns and villages.

Indian religions

Indian rock-cut architecture
 

Hindu and Jain temples

 Kachner Jain Temple: This is a 250 years old temple dedicated to Parshvanath. The idol here is called Chintamani Parshvanath.

Gates and forts

 Gate: The city is also known for the 52 gates built during Mughal era which gives it the name of "City of Gates".

Mughal architecture

It is an imitation of the Taj Mahal at Agra and due to its similar design, it is popularly known as the "Taj of the Deccan".

Other

Panchakki: Panchakki, which literally means water mill, is a 17th-century watermill situated within the old city is known for its underground water channel, which traverses more than 8  km from nearby hills. The channel culminates into an artificial waterfall that powers the mill.
 Salim Ali Lake & Bird Sanctuary: Popularly known as Salim Ali Talab (lake) is located in the northern part of the city near Delhi Darwaza, opposite Himayat Bagh. During the Mughal period, it was known as Khiziri Talab. It has been renamed after the great ornithologist and naturalist Salim Ali. It also has a bird Sanctuary and a garden maintained by the Aurangabad Municipal Corporation.
Siddharth Garden and Zoo: is a park and zoo situated in near of the central bus station in Aurangabad. This is the only zoo in Marathwada region. There are various types of animals, birds, flowers and trees. The name of "Siddhartha" has been kept on the name of Gautama Buddha.

Mashru and Himroo
Himroo: The fabric is said to have originated in Persia, though not conclusively proved, Himroo is associated with the times of Mohammad Tughlaq who ruled in the 14th century. Fabrics and shawls from Aurangabad are much in demand for their unique style and design.
 Kaghzipura: A place situated near Daulatabad made first handmade paper in India after the technology was brought here by Mongol invaders. However, the use of paper was not widespread there until the 12th century.

Cuisine

Aurangabadi food is much like Mughlai or Hyderabadi cuisine with its fragrant pulao and biryani. Meat cooked in fresh spices and herbs is a speciality, as are the delectable sweets. The local cuisine is a blend of Mughlai and Hyderabadi cuisine, with an influence of the spices and herbs of the Marathwada region.

Naan Qalia is a dish that is associated with Aurangabad in India. It is a concoction of mutton and a variety of spices. Naan is the bread made in tandoor (Hot furnace) while Qalia is a mixture of mutton and various spices.
Aurangabad/Marathwada/Dakhni cuisine is a blend of the Puneri and the Hyderabadi cuisine (which blends the use of typical South Indian ingredients such as curry leaves, tamarind and coconut into their celebrated culinary practices).

Transport

Air
Aurangabad Airport is an airport serving the city and has connecting flights to Hyderabad, Delhi, Mumbai, Bangalore, Ahmedabad, Udaipur, Tirupati, Visakhapatnam and Thiruvananthapuram. In 2008, flights were made available to the people travelling to the Hajj pilgrimage.

Rail
Aurangabad railway station is the major railway station under Nanded railway division of the South Central Railway zone. It is located on the Kacheguda-Manmad section and has rail connectivity with major cities such as Delhi, Hyderabad, Latur Road, Manmad, Mumbai, Nagpur, Nanded, Nashik Road, Nizamabad and Pune. The work of DPR preparation is ongoing for metro in Aurangabad from Shendra and Waluj. The work of surveys and DPR is also ongoing for high speed rail line from Mumbai to Nagpur, which will have a halt in Aurangabad.

Road
Central Bus Stand, Aurangabad of MSRTC is the main public transport centre. Buses are available to every major bus depots of Maharashtra. Ola Cabs service is available in city. Major long route Aurangabad buses reach Delhi, Jaipur, Gandhinagar and Hyderabad in 2–3 days. MSRTC buses are also available for all district of Maharashtra and neighboring State's cities like Indore, Ujjain, Surat, Vadodara, Khandwa, Burhanpur, Khargone, Bhopal. There are Smart City Bus service in Aurangabad as the part of public transport in Aurangabad.

Education

Dr. Babasaheb Ambedkar Marathwada University (BAMU) is located in Aurangabad city. Many colleges in the region are affiliated to it. The university has 101 Colleges affiliated in Aurangabad and 99 Colleges in Beed, 53 & 55 Colleges affiliated in Jalna & Osmanabad.

Government College of Engineering, Aurangabad is an autonomous engineering college. It was affiliated to the Dr. Babasaheb Ambedkar Marathwada University and was established in 1960. The construction of the college was started in 1957 and was completed in 1960. Marathwada Institute of Technology and Jawaharlal Nehru Engineering College are two other engineering colleges in Aurangabad.

Maharashtra National Law University, Aurangabad is a state university located in Aurangabad. It was established in 2017 by the Government of Maharashtra, the third and final university to be installed through the Maharashtra National Law University Act, 2014

Maulana Azad College of Arts and Science was founded in 1963 by Rafiq Zakaria, who formed a trust called Maulana Azad Education Society to manage the affairs. The college is affiliated to Dr. Babasaheb Ambedkar Marathwada University of Aurangabad.

National Institute of Electronics & Information Technology Aurangabad (NIELIT Aurangabad) is located inside the Dr. B.A.M. University campus. It is a central government engineering institute under the Ministry of Communication & Information Technology Government of India. It offers DEPM, B.TECH (Electronics Engineering), M.tech (Electronics Design Technology), Ph.D., and short-term courses.

Aurangabad has schools run by the Aurangabad Municipal Corporation (AMC) and private schools owned and run by trusts and individuals. Government Polytechnic Aurangabad is one of the polytechnic institutions in Marathwada region.

Institute of Hotel Management, Aurangabad, is affiliated to University of Huddersfield. Students have internships in the Vivanta, Taj in Aurangabad.

In 1903, a treaty was signed between British and the Nizam to train the Nizam's Army and it was decided to establish a proper cantonment. Today the cantonment is spread across  with civil population of 19,274 as per 2001 census.

Sports
Garware Stadium is the municipal stadium in the city. International-standard cricket stadium at Aurangabad District Cricket Association Stadium is under construction. Jawaharlal Nehru Engineering College Sports Complex is a sports complex with in Jawaharlal Nehru Engineering College mainly used by college sports event.

Notable people
 

Malik Ambar, a Siddi military leader and founder of Khadki (former name of city).
Siraj Aurangabadi, 18th-century Indian Urdu and Persian poet
Prashant Bamb, MLA from the Gangapur constituency, member of the Bharatiya Janata Party
Ankit Bawne, cricketer
Sandipanrao Bhumre, MLA from Paithan constituency, member of Shiv Sena
Rajendra Darda, former MLA from Aurangabad East constituency, member of the Indian National Congress
Tarang Jain, businessman
Imtiyaz Jaleel, Indian politician and member of the All India Majlis-e-Ittehadul Muslimeen
Mayuri Kango, film actress
Chandrakant Khaire, Indian politician and member of Shiv Sena
Aurangabadi Mahal, wife of Mughal emperor Aurangzeb
Abul A'la Maududi, Pakistani theologian and philosopher of Islam
Bashar Nawaz, Indian Urdu poet and lyricist 
Dulari Qureshi, art historian
Iqbal Siddiqui, cricketer
Nikki Tamboli, film actress
Vineet Verma, film director
Rafiq Zakaria, Indian politician

See also
 List of twin towns and sister cities in India
 Bombay High Court
 Shirdi
 Mumbai
 Pedavadlapudi

References

External links

 
 
 Aurangabad District website
 

Metropolitan cities in India
Articles containing potentially dated statements from 2011
All articles containing potentially dated statements
 
1610 establishments in the Mughal Empire
Cities and towns in Aurangabad district, Maharashtra
Cities in Maharashtra
Former capital cities in India
Talukas in Maharashtra